Rovni Lake is a water reservoir in western Serbia, created by damming the Jablanica river. It is located between the villages of Stubo and Rovni,  from the city of Valjevo. The construction of the Stubo-Rovni dam was completed in September 2015. The lake is an integral part of the regional water management system "Rovni" providing water supply for several cities: Valjevo, Lazarevac, Lajkovac, Ub and Mionica.

Characteristics 

The dam is a rock-filled with water-resistant clay core. The works were executed by a joint venture formed by the companies "Hidrotehnika−Hidroenergetika" and "Energoprojekt Niskogradnja" plc, Belgrade, Serbia.

Works began in the late 1980s, and by 2018, it is still not completely finished. It is estimated that the entire costs of the project amount to €80 million. The conceived purpose of the project was multifunctional: waterworks supply, provision of the service water for the future thermal power station, protection from floods and keeping of the biological minimum of the river Jablanica and, downstream, of the Kolubara.

The tests in March 2018 showed that the water is of high quality and can be used for the waterworks, but the infrastructure is not completed. The pipes connect Rovni with the water treatment facility Pećina near Valjevo. Pećino itself is connected with the Oštrikovac reservoir in the village of Slovac, where pipelines from Lajkovac, Lazarevac and Ub should connect. The arm which supplies Mionica will detach at the village of Divci. It is expected that the works will begin in 2019, and the set deadline is 2021.

Controversy 

Filling of the accumulation caused a controversy when the public learned that it would submerge the Orthodox church of St. Michael in Tubravić, known as Valjevska Gračanica, originating in the 15th century. Despite the explanations by Serbian Patriarch Irinej and manager of the Public Utility "Kolubara" that the Church signed the contract and exchanged the property back in 1991, and that a replacement church had been built elsewhere, several public protests were held. However, the filling proceeded as planned, and the church got finally submerged on 15 March 2016.

2014 floods 

The lake is part of the Kolubara river watershed, as Jablanica is one of the headwaters which form the Kolubara, notorious for the flooding, especially of the town of Valjevo. Though it still wasn't completed, the reservoir was pivotal in protecting Valjevo during the 2014 Southeast Europe floods. The reservoir received the surplus of the water brought by the torrents and often flooded Valjevo suffered no damage. This fact was used in public debates about the lake, concerning the flooding of the church. The preventing of the flooding was often used as an exemplary of proper reaction in such situation, amidst the mostly weak reaction of the other parts of the protective system and the government in general (see Paljuvi Lake).

See also

 List of lakes in Serbia

References

External links 

Kolubara District
Lakes of Serbia